A mobile launcher platform (MLP), also known as mobile launch platform, is a structure used to support a large multistage space vehicle which is assembled (stacked) vertically in an integration facility (e.g. the Vehicle Assembly Building) and then transported by a crawler-transporter (CT) to a launch pad. This becomes the support structure for launch.

The use of mobile launcher platform is a part of the Integrate-Transfer-Launch (ITL) system, which involves vertical assembly, transport, and launch of rockets. The concept was first implemented in the 1960s for the United States Air Force's Titan III rocket, and it was later used by NASA for Saturn V, Space shuttle, and Space Launch System.

There are alternatives ITL. Horizontal assembly and transport to the pad is used by Russia, by ULA for the Delta IV family, and by SpaceX for the Falcon 9 family. Vertical assembly on the launch pad is used for smaller launch vehicles and for the SpaceX Starship.

Kennedy Space Center 

From 1967 to 2011, three platforms were used at the LC-39 to support NASA's launch vehicles. Formerly called Mobile Launchers (ML), the mobile launcher platforms were constructed for transporting and launching the Saturn V rocket for the Apollo program lunar landing missions of the 1960s and 1970s. Each ML originally had a single exhaust vent for the Saturn V's engines.  The Mobile Launchers also featured a  Launch Umbilical Tower (LUT) with nine swing arms that permitted servicing of the vehicle on the launch pad, and swung away from it at launch.

The Mobile Launchers were built by Ingalls Iron Works. The swing arms were constructed by Hayes International.

After the Apollo program, the bases of the Mobile Launchers were modified for the Space Shuttle. The Launch Umbilical Towers from ML-2 and ML-3 were removed. Portions of these tower structures were erected at the two launch pads, 39A and 39B. These permanent structures were known as the Fixed Service Structures (FSS). The LUT from ML-1 was taken apart and stored in the Kennedy Space Center's industrial area. Efforts to preserve the LUT in the 1990s failed due to a lack of funding, and it was scrapped.

In addition to removal of the umbilical towers, each Shuttle-era MLP was extensively reconfigured with the addition of two Tail Service Masts (TSM), one on either side of the main engine exhaust vent.  These  masts contained the feed lines through which liquid hydrogen (LH2) and liquid oxygen (LOX) were loaded into the shuttle's external fuel tank, as well as electrical hookups and flares that were used to burn off any ambient hydrogen vapors at the launch site immediately prior to Main Engine start.

The main engines vented their exhaust through the original opening used for the Saturn rocket exhaust.  Two additional exhaust ports were added to vent exhaust from the Space Shuttle Solid Rocket Boosters (SRBs) that flanked the external fuel tank.

The Space Shuttle assembly was held to the MLP at eight holddown points using large studs, four on the aft skirt of each Solid Rocket Booster. Immediately before SRB ignition, frangible nuts attached to the top of these studs were detonated, releasing the Shuttle assembly from the platform.

Each crawler weighs about  unloaded, has a maximum speed of about  loaded, and has a leveling system designed to keep the launch vehicle vertical while negotiating the 5 percent grade leading to the top of the launch pad. Two  diesel engines power each crawler.

The MLPs were designed as part of NASA's strategy for vertical assembly and transport of space vehicles.  Vertical assembly allows the preparation of the spacecraft in a ready-for-launch position, and avoids the additional step of lifting or craning a horizontally-assembled vehicle onto the launchpad (as the engineers of the Soviet space program chose to do).

Mobile Launcher Platform-1 

Construction of the Mobile Launcher Platform-1 (MLP-1) (formerly called the Mobile Launcher-3 or ML-3) began in 1964 and was completed with the installation of the Launch Umbilical Tower hammerhead crane on 1 March 1965. The swing arms were added at a later date.

The ML-3 was used for five crewed Apollo launches; Apollo 10, Apollo 13, Apollo 15, Apollo 16 and Apollo 17.

Following the launch of Apollo 17, the ML-3 was the first of the Mobile Launchers to be converted for use by the Space Shuttle. The Launch Umbilical Tower was dismantled and later partially reassembled on LC-39A as that pad's Fixed Service Structure (FSS) and the base of the launch platform was modified to accommodate the locations of engines on the Shuttle. The platform was redesignated MLP-1.

In total, the MLP-1 was used for 52 Shuttle launches between 1981 and 2009. It was used for the first Space Shuttle launch, STS-1, in April 1981. Following the launch of STS-119 in March 2009, it was transferred to the Constellation program. The platform was used only for the Ares I-X and the MLP-1 suffered substantial damage. The canceled Ares I-Y would have used the same MLP. However, the Constellation program was canceled and the MLP was left unused.

Following the STS-135, usable parts from the MLP-1 were removed and stored in the Vehicle Assembly Building, with no plans to use the MLP again.

In 2021, NASA began rolling out Mobile Launch Platform-1 on Crawler transporter-2 with a concrete ballast on the top to condition the crawlerway to handle the combined weight of the Space Launch System and Orion spacecraft in the future. NASA stated that re-conditioning of the crawlerway will be required periodically in the future, and MLP-1 will be retained for that purpose. MLP-1 will be stored in High Bay 1 of the Vehicle Assembly Building when not in use for crawlerway maintenance.

Mobile Launcher Platform-2 

Mobile Launcher Platform-2 (MLP-2) (formerly called the Mobile Launcher-2 or ML-2) was used for the uncrewed Apollo 6 mission, followed by three crewed Apollo launches; Apollo 9, Apollo 12 and Apollo 14. It was subsequently used for the launch of Skylab on a Saturn V in 1973.

Following the launch of Skylab, ML-2 was the second of the Mobile Launchers to be converted for use by the Space Shuttle. The Launch Umbilical Tower was dismantled and partially reassembled to become the LC-39B Fixed Service Structure (FSS), and the base of the launch platform was modified to accommodate the locations of engines on the Shuttle. The platform was redesignated MLP-2.

In total, MLP-2 was used for 44 Shuttle launches, starting in 1983. All of the orbiters except  made their maiden flights from MLP-2. It was also the launch site for the ill-fated STS-51L mission, when  disintegrated shortly after launch, killing all seven crew members.

Following the Space Shuttle retirement, NASA kept the MLP-2 for liquid-propellant rockets, but in January 2021, NASA announced that due to lack of storage space, the massive structure would be demolished.

Mobile Launcher Platform-3 

The first launch from the Mobile Launcher Platform-3 (MLP-3) (formerly called the Mobile Launcher-1 or ML-1) was the maiden flight of the Saturn V, and the first launch from LC-39, Apollo 4. Following this, it was used for two crewed Apollo launches: Apollo 8 and Apollo 11. After NASA decided to move Saturn IB launches from LC-34 to LC-39B, the ML-1 was modified by the addition of a structure known as the Milkstool, which allowed the Saturn IB to use the same Launch Umbilical Tower as the much larger Saturn V. Three manned flights to Skylab, and the Apollo launch for the Apollo-Soyuz Test Project, were conducted from the ML-1 using the Milkstool.

Prior to the scrapping of the LUT in 2004, there was a campaign to rebuild and preserve it as a memorial to Project Apollo. The crew access arm is preserved at the Kennedy Space Center Visitor Complex on the upper level of the gift shop.

Following the launch of Apollo-Soyuz, ML-1 was the last Mobile Launcher to be converted for use by the Space Shuttle. The LUT and Milkstool were dismantled and placed into storage, and the base of the launch platform was modified to accommodate the locations of engines on the shuttle. The platform was redesignated MLP-3.

In total, MLP-3 was used for 29 Shuttle launches, starting in 1990. It was the least used of the three MLPs. Following the Space Shuttle retirement, NASA kept the MLP-3 for solid-propellant rockets.

Usage of MLP-3 to launch the OmegA rocket was granted to Orbital ATK (later bought out by Northrop Grumman) following discussions in 2016, and later formalized through a Reimbursable Space Act Agreement in August 2019. Under the Agreement, Vehicle Assembly Building High Bay 2 would be used to assemble the rocket, while MLP-3 and crawler-transporter 1 would be used to move the rocket to LC-39B for launch. From 2019 to 2020, the OmegA launch tower was under construction on MLP-3. Following the cancellation of OmegA in September 2020, work began to demolish the half-completed launch tower. As of January 2021, MLP-3 is planned to be placed in storage in High Bay 2 of the Vehicle Assembly Building.

Space Launch System 

Between 2009 and 2010, a mobile launcher platform called the Mobile Launcher-1 (ML-1) was constructed as part of the Constellation program. Since the cancellation of the program in 2010, ML-1 was converted for the Space Launch System Block 1, with various phases of construction between 2013 and 2018. The total cost of the ML-1 is estimated to be $1 billion.

The biggest modification to the ML-1 was on the platform's base, where engineers increased the size of a  exhaust duct to a rectangle stretching  and strengthened the surrounding structure. SLS weighs more than twice as much as the planned Ares I rocket. The Ares I rocket would have featured a single solid-fueled first stage, while the SLS includes two large solid rocket boosters and a powerful core with four RS-25 engines. The ML-1 also features a  Launch Umbilical Tower (LUT) with several arms that permit servicing of the SLS on the launch pad, and swing away from it at launch.

In June 2019, NASA awarded a contract for the design and construction of the Mobile Launcher-2 (ML-2) for SLS Block 1B. Construction of the ML-2 began in July 2020, with the planned completion in 2023. The total cost of the ML-2 is estimated to be $450 million.

Cape Canaveral

Atlas V 
The Atlas V utilizes an MLP when launching from SLC-41. The design of this MLP is derived from the MLPs used by the Titan III and IV rockets.

Titan III and Titan IV 
Titan III and Titan IV rockets launched from SLC-40 and SLC-41 utilized MLPs to decouple assembly of the launch vehicle from launch. This was meant to enable simultaneous assembly of multiple launch vehicles as part of the Titan's Integrate-Transfer-Launch (ITL) concept, allowing a high flight rate from a small number of launch pads.

Vulcan 
United Launch Alliance's Vulcan will use an MLP similar in design to the one used by the Atlas V when launching from SLC-41, altered to support the former's larger design. It will be equipped with various electronics, power-lines, and cables to support and control the rocket. For the initial Vulcan-Centaur configuration, the MLP will supply liquefied natural gas and liquid oxygen to the first stage, and liquid hydrogen and liquid oxygen to the Centaur upper stage.  the basic structure has been completed, but the umbilicals and equipment have yet to be installed.

Other uses 

Japanese H-IIA and H-IIB rockets utilize an MLP when launching from the Yoshinobu Launch Complex.

The PSLV, GSLV, and GSLV Mark III rockets utilize an MLP called the Mobile Launch Pedestal. The rockets are stacked on the Mobile Launch Pedestal in the Vehicle Assembly Building (VAB; not to be confused with the NASA building with the same name), and are then rolled-out towards the launch pad.

Sound suppression system 

Once delivered to the pad, the mobile launcher platform is connected to the larger sound suppression system by large pipes which deliver a deluge of water from an adjacent water tower. Six  towers known as "rainbirds" spray water over the MLP and into the flame deflector trenches below it, absorbing acoustic waves. The suppression system reduced the acoustic sound level to approximately 142 dB.

References

External links

Virtual tour of the Space Launch System Mobile Launcher

Historic American Engineering Record in Florida
Rocket launch technologies